Sara Zohrabi Nia (born 13 November 1996), known as Sara Zohrabi, is an Iranian footballer who plays as a midfielder for Kowsar Women Football League club Heyat Football Alborz and the senior Iran women's national team.

International goals

References

External links

1996 births
Living people
Iranian women's footballers
Iran women's international footballers
Women's association football midfielders
People from Izeh
Sportspeople from Khuzestan province
21st-century Iranian women